How to Talk Dirty and Influence People is an autobiography by Lenny Bruce, an American satirist and comedian, who died in 1966 at age 40 of a drug overdose.

At the request of Hugh Hefner and with the aid of Paul Krassner, Bruce wrote the work in serialized format for Playboy in 1964 and 1965. Shortly thereafter it was released as a book by Playboy Publishing. The book details the course of his career, which began in the late 1940s. In it, he challenges the sanctity of organized religion and other societal and political conventions he perceived as having hypocritical tendencies, and widened the boundaries of free speech. The title is a parody of the 1936 bestseller How to Win Friends and Influence People, by Dale Carnegie.

References

External links
 

1965 non-fiction books
Lenny Bruce
Show business memoirs
Works about freedom of expression